On October 6, 2022, a stabbing spree occurred along the Las Vegas Strip, killing two people and injuring at least 6. The incident occurred in front of the Wynn Casino. It is the deadliest stabbing attack in the United States since the 2020 Knox County stabbing.

Attack
It was before 11:40 a.m. when performers dressing as showgirls were approached by the suspect outside the Wynn hotel-casino: the suspect claimed to be a chef. There were eight victims in the attack. The suspect asked to take a picture with some showgirls. He stated that he thought they were, "laughing at him and making fun of his clothing", so he stabbed two of the showgirls. He then began running and attacked 6 more people. The victims were a combination of locals and tourists.

References

2022 in Nevada
October 2022 crimes in the United States
21st century in Las Vegas
Stabbing attacks in 2022
Deaths by stabbing in Nevada
Mass stabbings in the United States
Violence against women in the United States
Las Vegas Strip